Carnac-Rouffiac is a commune in the Lot department in south-western France.

Geography
The Séoune forms most of the commune's south-eastern border.

See also
Communes of the Lot department

References

Carnacrouffiac